CDK-activating kinase assembly factor MAT1 is an enzyme that in humans is encoded by the MNAT1 gene.

Function 

 Cyclin-dependent kinases (CDKs), which play an essential role in cell cycle control of eukaryotic cells, are phosphorylated and thus activated by the CDK-activating kinase (CAK). CAK is a multisubunit protein that includes CDK7 (MIM 601955), cyclin H (CCNH; MIM 601953), and MAT1. MAT1 (for 'ménage à trois-1') is involved in the assembly of the CAK complex.[supplied by OMIM]

Interactions 

MNAT1 has been shown to interact with:

 Cyclin H, 
 Cyclin-dependent kinase 7,
 Estrogen receptor alpha, 
 MCM7, 
 MTA1, 
 P53,  and
 POU2F1.

References

Further reading

External links